Víctor de la Lama (11 December 1919 – 7 May 2015) was a Mexican sailor. He competed in the 5.5 Metre event at the 1964 Summer Olympics.

References

External links
 

1919 births
2015 deaths
Mexican male sailors (sport)
Olympic sailors of Mexico
Sailors at the 1964 Summer Olympics – 5.5 Metre
Sportspeople from Mexico City